Anna Katrina Dumilon Nadal-López (born September 16, 1980) is a Filipina singer-songwriter who was formerly the lead vocalist for the alternative rock band, Mojofly.  Her popularity in the female OPM niche grew after she released a self-titled solo album featuring her chart-topping single, "Huwag na Huwag Mong Sasabihin". Her debut self-titled album Kitchie Nadal debuted at number 4 on the Philippine Albums Chart, and after a year end the album climbed up at number 1 with growing sales the album was certified 7×Platinum by PARI with sales of 214,800 physical CD album copies in the Philippines.

Career
In 2004, Nadal revived a Carpenters song, "Merry Christmas Darling" from the Warner Philippines Christmas album, The Warner Music Philippines All-Stars Christmas Collection.

In 2005, to support the United Nations Millennium Campaign, Nadal and 26 other Filipino artists contributed to the album entitled Tayo Tayo Rin Sa 2015 - Sing the Songs. Find your Voice. Change the World. It's your Choice, released by the United Nations (in the Philippines).
March 2008 saw Nadal releasing her second album Love Letter with 17 all original tracks. Her latest single Highway, which was used for Caltex, had extensive radio airplay.

Nadal's interpretation of Iniibig Kita has been included in ABS-CBN's first tele-epiko Rounin. In 2008, ABS-CBN picked her again to revive Himala (a Rivermaya original), as the supposed theme song for the soap Humingi Ako Sa Langit (retitled as Habang May Buhay).

She formerly endorsed multinational gas company Caltex. Nadal appeared in a Caltex commercial along with other international musicians.

Personal life
Nadal is an alumna of St. Scholastica's College, Manila. She also completed a double degree major in education and psychology at De La Salle University-Manila.

She married Spanish journalist Carlos López in 2015 in Tagaytay, and in 2017, she gave birth to their first son named Keon. The family currently resides in Madrid.

Discography
 2004 - Kitchie Nadal (Warner Music Group)
 2007 - Drama Queen TV EP (GMA Music)
 2008 - Love Letter (Be.Live Artists)
 2013 - Malaya (12 Stone/Universal Records)

Collaboration albums that include Kitchie Nadal
Tunog Acoustic 1 to 4 (Warner Music Philippines, 2003–2006)
Acoustic Night Live 2 (Viva Records, 2004)
Perfectly Acoustic 2 (Octoarts Music Philippines, 2004)
All-Star Christmas Collection (Warner Music Philippines, 2004)
The MDG Album: Tayo Tayo Rin Sa 2015 (UN Philippines, 2005)
Supersize Rock (Warner Music Philippines, 2005)
Ultraelectromagneticjam!: The Music Of The Eraserheads (Sony BMG Music Philippines, 2005)
Kami nAPO muna: A Tribute to APO (Universal Records, 2006)
The Best Of Manila Sound: Hopia Mani Popcorn (Viva Records, 2006)
Mga Awit ng Puso: The Best of GMA Themes Vol. 2 (GMA Music, 2006)
I-Star 15: The Best of Alternative & Rock (Star Music, 2010)

Singles

"Run"
"Fire"
"Bulong"
"Huwag Na Huwag Mong Sasabihin" (covered by Michael V. as a parody song, now covered by SUD)
"Ligaya" (Original by Eraserheads, now covered by Mayonnaise)
"Majika" (Original TV Theme from the GMA 7 Telebabad Program, Majika)
"Merry Christmas Darling" (Original by The Carpenters)
"Pag-Ibig" (Original by APO Hiking Society, now covered by Regine Velasquez-Alcasid as an ad jingle for Nestlé)
"Pers-Labs" (Original by Cinderella, now covered by Charlie Green)
"Same Ground"
"Malaya"
"Simula Ngayon"
"Wandering Stars"

Soundtracks
Rounin TV Soundtrack (Star Music, 2007)

Collaborations
Additional vocals for Ilog for Rivermaya's album Isang Ugat, Isang Dugo, 2006
Greatest Day - duet w/ Barbie Almalbis, a single written for Sunsilk (Unilever Philippines), 2007
Makulay Na Buhay - Kitchie wrote the theme song for the GMA TV show I Luv NY, sung by Jolina Magdangal.
In A Big Way - a duet with European pop/rock band INSIGHT. There are two versions of this song in the album LOVE LETTER, the Kitchie Nadal version and the Insight version.
Walk On Water - Akshai Sarin is a co-writer and producer
Tadhana - Kitchie shares writing credits with Jack Rufo
Idoy, Uday - Kitchie and Bullet Dumas perform Dumas' arrangement of the traditional Waray song.

Awards and nominations

References

External links

 
 Kitchie Nadal Live!
 Online registry of Filipino musical artists and their works: Kitchie Nadal

1980 births
De La Salle University alumni
Filipino musicians
Filipino rock musicians
Filipino rock singers
Filipino singer-songwriters
Living people
Musicians from Manila
Filipino expatriates in Spain
St. Scholastica's College Manila alumni
Warner Music Group artists
GMA Music artists
Universal Records (Philippines) artists
21st-century Filipino singers
21st-century Filipino women singers